Coteau Bourgeois is an unincorporated community in Livingston Parish, Louisiana, United States. The site is on Louisiana Highway 22 and is one mile south of Head of Island on the Amite River.

Etymology
In the French language the word Coteau means Hill and Bourgeois was the name for a wealthy class of French citizens in the late 18th century.

References

Unincorporated communities in Livingston Parish, Louisiana
Unincorporated communities in Louisiana